Morioka is the capital city of Iwate Prefecture located in the Tohoku region of northern Japan.

Morioka may also refer to:

Morioka (surname), a Japanese surname
Morioka Domain, a former subdivision of Japan
Morioka University, a university in Takizawa, Iwate, Japan